The 2010 Colorado gubernatorial election was held on Tuesday, November 2, 2010 to elect the Governor of Colorado, who would serve a four-year term that began in January 2011. One-term incumbent Democrat Bill Ritter announced that he would not run for re-election in 2010. Dan Maes, backed by the Tea Party movement, won the Republican nomination in the primary with 50.6% of the vote and a 1.3% margin over rival Scott McInnis. In claiming victory, Maes called on former representative Tom Tancredo, running as the Constitution Party's nominee to "stop your campaign tonight." Denver mayor John Hickenlooper was unopposed for the Democratic nomination. Hickenlooper won the race with over 50% of the vote.

Democratic primary

Candidates

Declared
John Hickenlooper, Mayor of Denver

Declined
Bill Ritter, incumbent Governor
Ken Salazar, United States Secretary of the Interior and former U.S. Senator
Andrew Romanoff, former Speaker of the Colorado House of Representatives (ran for U.S. Senate)

Results

Republican primary

Candidates

Declared
Dan Maes, businessman
Scott McInnis, former U.S. Representative

Declined
John Suthers, Colorado Attorney General
Josh Penry, State Senator
Tom Tancredo, former U.S. Representative

Pre-primary polling and developments
While a head-to-head polling matchup of McInnis against Maes by Survey USA was not reported for July 2010, the McInnis plagiarism story and the entry of Tom Tancredo into the race led to a changed landscape in advance of the August 10 Republican primary. "When asked who would be the 'strongest Republican gubernatorial candidate,' ... Tancredo easily led the pack of six choices with 29 percent. McInnis followed with 19 percent, and ... Maes, had 13 percent. Another 17 percent ... were not sure", in the Survey USA poll commissioned by the Denver Post and 9News. While Tancredo's run was on the Constitution Party ticket, he spoke as a Republican in responding to the poll results. "Tancredo, originally a McInnis supporter, has said that both Maes and McInnis should 'both eventually drop out' of the race even if it's after one wins the primary. 'Neither can win the general election,' he said. Tancredo said he was 'surprised and flattered' by the poll results. 'I want us as a party to get this governor's seat,' he said. 'If I can do it, believe me, I will.'" Tancredo was delivered a "message, signed by tea party, 9-12 Project and constitutionalist groups, [which] read in part: 'Withdraw your ultimatum, stay in the Republican Party, let the process play out for the governor's race within the rules already set forth, and continue to help us improve this party, its candidates, and the process — in other words to trust and respect the newly awakened, energized and informed voters of Colorado.'" As of late July, both McInnis and Maes had rejected Tancredo's ultimatum that they withdraw before or after the primary. And "political observers — and even state GOP chairman Dick Wadhams — were already predicting [Tancredo]'s entry into the race sounded the death knell for the party's gubernatorial bid and may cause problems for state legislative races. 'It's difficult if not impossible to beat ... Hickenlooper with Tancredo in the race,' said Wadhams, noting that Tancredo will siphon just enough votes away from the GOP nominee to give Hickenlooper a win."  Post-primary polling (see below), however, showed growing support for Tancredo with Maes in danger of receiving a vote share in the single digits.

McInnis vs. Maes

Results

Libertarian Party

Candidates
Jaimes Brown
Dan "Kilo" Sallis, 2008 vice presidential candidate of the Boston Tea Party

Results

American Constitution Party

Confirmed
Tom Tancredo, former Republican U.S. Representative

General election

Candidates
Tom Tancredo (ACP), former Republican U.S. Representative
Running mate: Pat Miller, former State Representative and nominee for CO-02 in 1994 and 1996
Jaimes Brown (L)
Running mate: Ken Wyble
Jason R. Clark (UAF)
Paul Fiorino (I)
Running mate: Heather McKibbin
John Hickenlooper (D), Mayor of Denver
Running mate: Joe Garcia, Colorado State University-Pueblo President
Dan Maes (R), businessman
Running mate: Tambor Williams, former State Representative

Predictions

Polling

Graphical summary

Results

Aftermath

American Constitution Party gets major party status
A result of Tancredo's ACP candidacy and Maes' political implosion was the party's legal elevation from minor to major party status. 

Under state law, Tancredo's showing in the gubernatorial election elevated the American Constitution Party  from minor to major party status. Any party that earns 10% or more of the votes cast for governor is a "major party." Major party status gives the party a place at or near the top of the ballot in the 2014 gubernatorial election. However, because of the additional organizational, financial, and compliance requirements triggered by major party status, ACP leaders have been ambivalent about the change.

As the campaign wore on, the question was not whether Hickenlooper would win, but whether Maes would get at least 10% of the vote.  Had he dropped below 10%, the Republican Party would have been legally defined as a minor party under Colorado law. Maes' campaign received no financial support from the Colorado GOP, RNC, nor the Republican Governor's Association.  Ultimately, he finished with 11 percent of the vote, just 20,477 votes over the threshold, allowing the Colorado GOP to retain major party status. 

The Constitution Party did not field a candidate in the 2014 election, and thus lost its major party status.

See also

Colorado Democratic Party
Colorado Republican Party
American Constitution Party
Libertarian Party of Colorado

References

External links
Colorado Secretary of State – Elections Division
Colorado Governor Candidates at Project Vote Smart
Campaign contributions for 2010 Colorado Governor from Follow the Money
Colorado Governor 2010 from OurCampaigns.com
2010 Colorado Gubernatorial General Election: Dan Maes (R) vs John Hickenlooper (D) vs Tom Tancredo (i) graph of multiple polls from Pollster.com
Election 2010: Colorado Governor from Rasmussen Reports
2010 Colorado Governor – McInnis vs. Hickenlooper from Real Clear Politics
Race Profile in The New York Times
Collected news and commentary at Election 2010 at The Denver Post
Debate
Colorado Republican Gubernatorial Primary Debate on C-SPAN, July 29, 2010
Official campaign websites (Archived)
John Hickenlooper for Governor
Dan Maes for Governor
Tom Tancredo for Governor
Jason Clark for Governor
Jaimes Brown for Governor

2010
Governor
Colorado
John Hickenlooper